There Will Be Love is the tenth studio album by Australian recording artist Adam Brand. The album was released on 10 August 2012 and peaked at number 4 on the ARIA charts; Brand's highest charting album.

Upon release, Brand told Troy Culpan "I like to think of it as an album of hope... I mean we all go through things in our life, we go through ups and downs and twists and turns that life throws at you and sometimes you can come out of the other end of it feeling cynical, or you can come out of it feeling hopeful and for me that's what the album represents - being hopeful."

Track listing

Charts

Weekly charts

Year-end charts

Release history

References

2012 albums
Adam Brand (musician) albums
Sony Music Australia albums